The Battle of Uruzgan takes place in Uruzgan, Afghanistan during the reign of Amir Abdur Rahman in 1893 between the Hazaras and Abdul Rahman's army, which were government military forces and non-government forces, and the majority of which included the Pashtuns. Thereafter, on Hazara defeat, the Hazaras were uprooted from Uruzgan by Abdur Rahman and Pashtun tribes were resettled in Uruzgan. Some Hazaras migrated to British India (Quetta) and Iran (Mashhad). In 1901, Amir Habibullah Khan granted amnesty to the migrated Hazaras and asked them to return. Some returning Hazaras were then resettled in Afghan Turkistan and Balkh Province, but were not allowed to return to Uruzgan.

See also
1888–1893 Hazara uprisings
Persecution of Hazaras

References

History of Urozgan Province
Uruzgan
Hazara people
Hazara history
Uruzgan
1893 in Afghanistan